Aristolochia cauliflora is a species of Aristolochia found in Ecuador and Peru

References

External links

cauliflora
Flora of Ecuador
Flora of Peru